NewBoy FZCO is a family-owned company based in Dubai, UAE, and the exclusive owner of the famous doll brand  Fulla. Fulla is thought to be the best-selling toy in the girls doll category throughout the Arab world. Fulla is the cultural adaptation of family values as reflected within the cultural norms throughout the region.

Founded in 1999, NewBoy engages in the marketing and distribution of toys, food, stationery, nursery and toiletries products and has an extensive distribution network in the MENA region with strong focus on KSA as a major hub. The company also markets selected toy brands and ranges internationally including: Europe, United States, Korea, India and Indonesia.

Business Divisions

Licensing
NewBoy's involvement in licensing activities goes back to the earliest days of the company, when NewBoy advertised its own label products on TV. The ads featured endearing little characters that proved to be very popular with children across the region.  Accordingly, NewBoy realized the enormous benefits of having such popular character endorsement.

Since then, Licensing has become one of the most strategic business models for NewBoy, where magnifying the benefits drawn from a successful character is key. Currently, NewBoy acquires, sells, and markets licenses for some of the hottest characters throughout a number of categories including food, textile, cosmetics, jewellery, etc.

International Business Division
The division was first established in late 2003 by acquiring a worldwide rights for TV, Merchandizing and Toys for Let’s & Go property (Japanese Property from ShoPro). The property is based on an animated children’s TV program which features the adventures of two boys who have a passion for mini 4-wheel drive car racing. This was a huge success for NewBoy. The property was already launched in Italy, Spain, Portugal, Greece, Mexico, Puerto Rico, Argentina and Panama. New launching plans are currently underway in France, Brazil, Germany and South Africa.

The division is currently working on a new toy concept and has recently entered into a new agreement with d-rights Inc., an integrated production company based in Japan handling entertainment contents in animation and live-action films around the world. Under the new agreement, NewBoy and d-rights will be co-producing a new TV animation in 52 episodes, 30 minutes each. The new animation is targeted at boys 4–12 years old and is based on the new toy concept.
susuzysusy

Private Label

The Private Label division has been established strategically to create and develop NewBoy’s own brands across a wide range of product categories. NewBoy is focused in developing brands and products that adhere to the quality and safety standards.

NewBoy Brands currently include:
 Fulla - fashion doll and associated TV show Fulla Princess, which the show is remade from Secret Jouju by Korean toy company Young Toys
 Fun to Learn – electronic learning aids
 Baby Habibi – baby dolls and accessories
 True Play – nursery and toddler toys
krash toys-the Toy shop company

Current Status
Currently NewBoy is closed while operating under different names one of them is Wahat Al-Atfal.

References

External links
 

NewBoy
Companies based in Dubai
Toy companies of the United Arab Emirates
Companies established in 1999
1999 establishments in the United Arab Emirates
Food and drink companies of the United Arab Emirates
Family-owned companies